Emborough Quarries is a 1 hectare (2.5 acre) geological Site of Special Scientific Interest at Emborough in the Mendip Hills, Somerset, notified in 1971.

The disused quarry has yielded a wide variety of remains of vertebrate fossils, amongst which the early reptiles are particularly well represented. Of special note is Kuehneosaurus latus which is one of the earliest-known flying vertebrates. During the Triassic period of geological time, some 230 million years ago, the limestones now exposed on Mendip formed upland areas upon which a number of large rivers rose. Solution cavities were soon created in the land surface and material from the surrounding area was swept into the newly formed cave systems. Remains of the creatures living in the upland areas during this time were swept into these deposits and have now been exhumed by recent quarrying activities. Fresh material is brought to the surface with every rock fall and Emborough Quarries are a nationally important source of fossil vertebrate remains for research and study.

This former Mendip quarry site, probably owned by Emborough Stone Co., a branch of Roads Reconstruction, Ltd., where iron ore was once mined is now home to an assembly of contractor's plant (possibly of Richard Wood (Engineering) Ltd), cranes and machine tools. It is the location of Nettlebridge Viaduct, a seven-arch bridge that once carried the Somerset and Dorset Railway.

The site was owned by Emborough Stone Co which was later bought by Roads Reconstruction Ltd.  The rock quarried was carboniferous mountain limestone which was used for construction and railway ballast.  There are 2 main quarries and several trial quarries.  The site was previously used by the Emborough Brick Co for making clay bricks.

Blatchford Light Railway 
The Blatchford Light Railway narrow-gauge railway is located within the quarry. This  gauge railway was originally intended to serve a pre-cast concrete plant in the quarry, but after that enterprise failed, it was retained as a private railway. The line starts at an industrial building in the No. 1 quarry, passes under Nettlebridge Viaduct and loops round the lake in No. 2 quarry. The following industrial locomotives were present in 2011:

See also 
 Quarries of the Mendip Hills

References 

Quarries in the Mendip Hills
Sites of Special Scientific Interest in Somerset
Sites of Special Scientific Interest notified in 1971
Geology of Somerset